In light of the British Government policy of maintaining sporting links with apartheid South Africa (which was subject to a general sporting boycott at the time), Bermuda did not decide until very late whether to join what was a significant boycott of the 1986 Commonwealth Games in Edinburgh, Scotland. The team took part in the Opening Ceremony but withdrew from the Games the following day.

References

Nations at the 1986 Commonwealth Games
Bermuda at the Commonwealth Games
1986 in Bermuda